Harbor Mountain Press is an American, nonprofit, poetry press located in White River Junction, Vermont. The press was founded by poet and editor Peter Money in 2006 (in Brownsville, Vermont). Notable authors published by the press include Alice B. Fogel, Sinan Antoon, Jan Clausen, Robert Farnsworth, Ana Merino, Laura Davies Foley, Elizabeth Robinson, Elena Georgiou, Norman MacAfee, and Mario Susko. Harbor Mountain Press titles have been reviewed in venues including Time, Library Journal, Bookslut and others. The press has received funding from the Byrne Foundation and Pentangle Council on the Arts and individual donors. Harbor Mountain Press titles are distributed by Small Press Distribution and GenPop Books.

References

External links
 
 Feature: Poets & Writers > Small Press Points > by Kevin Larimer > 11/01/2008
 Interview: Cervena Barva Press > Interview with Peter Money

Poetry publishers
Book publishing companies of the United States
Non-profit organizations based in Vermont
Vermont culture
Publishing companies established in 2006
American companies established in 2006